Dryophilus pusillus is a species of beetle in the family Ptinidae.

References

External links
Image. University of Wroclaw.

Ptinidae
Beetles described in 1808